A Taste for Passion is an album by French jazz fusion artist Jean-Luc Ponty that was released in 1979. It was reissued by Atlantic on CD in 1990 and 1992.

Track listing 
All songs by Jean-Luc Ponty.
"Stay with Me" – 5:35
"Sunset Drive" – 5:45
"Dreamy Eyes" – 4:18
"Beach Girl" – 4:56
"A Taste for Passion" – 5:22
"Life Cycles" – 5:45
"Reminiscence" – 1:26
"Give Us a Chance" – 3:02
"Obsession" – 0:40
"Farewell" – 3:06

Personnel 
 Jean-Luc Ponty – acoustic violin, 5-string electric violin; organ & electric piano (tracks 3, 5); grand piano (track 7)
 Joaquin Lievano – acoustic & electric guitar, guitar synth; guitar solos (tracks 3-5)
 Jamie Glaser – electric guitar; guitar solos (tracks 2, 6)
 Allan Zavod – keyboards, synthesizer; synthesizer solos (tracks 6, 8)
 Ralphe Armstrong – fretless electric bass; bass solo (track 2)
 Casey Scheuerell – drums, percussion

Production
 Engineer: Ed E. Thacker
 Assistant engineers: Lenise Bent, Cheech d'Amico
 Mastered by Greg Calbi
 Gary Heery – photography
 Tim Messer – production coordination

Recorded at Village Recorders, West Los Angeles, California.
Mixed at Cherokee Studios, Hollywood, California - June & July 1979.
Mastered at Sterling Sound, New York City.

Chart positions

References

External links 
 Jean-Luc Ponty - A Taste for Passion (1979) album review by Richard S. Ginell, credits & releases at AllMusic
 Jean-Luc Ponty - A Taste for Passion (1979) album releases & credits at Discogs
 Jean-Luc Ponty - A Taste for Passion (1979) album to be listened as stream on Spotify

Jean-Luc Ponty albums
1979 albums
Atlantic Records albums